Industrial Relations Code, 2020 consolidates and amends the laws relating to Trade Unions, conditions of employment in industrial establishment or undertaking, investigation and settlement of industrial disputes. The code combines and simplifies 3 Central Labour Laws.

Industrial Relations Code, 2020 introduced more conditions for workers to strike, alongside an increase in the threshold relating to layoffs and retrenchment in industrial establishments having 300 workers from 100 workers to provide more flexibility to employers for hiring and firing workers without government permission.

The proposed legislation provides for a broader framework to protect the rights of workers to form unions, to minimise the friction between the employers and workers and to provide provisions for investigation and settlement of industrial disputes.

Industrial Relations Code amends the definition of "strike" to "mass casual leave". If over 50 per cent of a company's workers take concerted casual leave, it will be treated as a strike. However, workers cannot go on strike without a 14 days (not exceeding 60 days) notice.

The Lok Sabha passed the bill on 22 September 2020 and the Rajya Sabha passed it on 23 September 2020. It was assented by the President on 28 September 2020, but the date of coming into force is yet to be notified.

Background

The bill was formulated according to the Report and Recommendations of the Second National Commission on Labour.

The Industrial Relations Code Bill, 2020 proposed for amalgamating, simplifying and rationalising the relevant provisions of three Acts.

 Trade Unions Act, 1926
 Industrial Employment (Standing Orders) Act, 1946
 Industrial Disputes Act, 1947

References

Indian labour law
Labour relations in India
Acts of the Parliament of India 2020